Manu Gavassi is the debut album of Brazilian singer-songwriter Manu Gavassi. The album contains thirteen tracks, the sound is defined with strong influence on teen pop and pop rock. The first single from the album was Garoto Errado. The song was released on June 11, 2011 and peaked at number 22 in Brazil's Billboard Hot 100. The second single from the album was Planos Impossíveis and was released on January 25, 2011. The song received positive reviews from critics and peaked at number 26 in Brazil's Billboard Hot 100. The album was produced by Rick Bonadio and released through Universal Music Brazil's subsidiary, Midas Music, on October 12, 2010.

Production 
Produced by Rick Bonadio and Andre Jung, the album featured Adam Stevens, lead singer of the band Stevens, playing guitar in Você Tá Namorando. Lucas Silveira, lead singer of the band Fresno, composed Canta Comigo especially for the Gavassi's debut album. In addition, Daniel Weksler, drummer of rock band NX Zero, recorded the drums for the aforementioned song and for Tudo Que eu Quiser (Yeah).

Track listing

References 

2010 albums
Albums produced by Rick Bonadio